Burncoat High School is a public magnet high school in Worcester, Massachusetts, in the United States. The school was formerly known as Burncoat Senior High School chiefly to distinguish it from the adjacent Burncoat Junior High School, now Burncoat Middle School.

Burncoat is known for its fine arts program, known as "Burncoat Fine Arts Magnet Program," which includes visual and performing arts such as theatre, music, dance, media arts chorus and art. Principal William Foley has said the fine arts program "has been in existence for 23 years, and it begins at the middle school level and continues through high school... The fine arts program at Burncoat is unlike any other in that it provides students the opportunity to develop the techniques and skills that will allow them to express themselves through the universal mediums of the arts... No other school in our area can offer their students this type of opportunity.”

Burncoat High School offers an array of Advanced Placement (AP) courses and has a wide range of programs including AVID, COAST Program for students on the Autism Spectrum, Life Skills Program, Best Buddies, S.T.E.P. (Structured Therapeutic Educational Program) for students with emotional challenges and offers Virtual High School (VHS) classes.

Burncoat is one of several Worcester Public Schools to be involved with the Massachusetts Math and Science Initiative (MMSI). MMSI drives a school culture of high expectations and dramatically increases participation and performance in Advanced Placement courses, particularly among underserved populations, to prepare students for college and career success in science, technology, engineering, and mathematics (STEM). The school's rivals are North High School, Doherty Memorial High School, and South High Community School.

Burncoat plays a significant role in the Worcester community and Burncoat and Greendale neighborhoods. Students at Burncoat have helped to organize the Burncoat Beetle Battle, and have contributed to the Be Like Brit Foundation and Children's Hospital Boston, among other organizations. Burncoat has a long-lasting relationship with The Hanover Insurance Group, which contributes to the school significantly.

The school has about 1,100 students, in grades 9 to 12, in the Worcester Public Schools district. The school's principal is William P. Foley. Foley graduated from Burncoat in 1986 and taught there for 10 years. Most recently, before coming back to Burncoat in 2007 as principal, Foley was an assistant principal at Doherty Memorial High School. The school serves the north side of Worcester.

Competitive teams

FIRST Robotics
Since 2006 Burncoat High School has competed in the FIRST Robotics Competition. The team is known as the Green Reapers and is sponsored by Worcester Polytechnic Institute and Boston Scientific. The team name is derived from the name for the gym - the Green Graveyard. Over the years the team has won the Rhode Island District Event in 2015 and the Chairman's Award at the Southern New Hampshire District Event in 2017 and 2019. The team has competed in the world championships three times in 2010, 2013, and 2014.

Varsity Sports
Burncoat High School has varsity sports including baseball, basketball, crew, cross country, field hockey, football, golf, ice hockey, lacrosse, soccer, softball, swimming, tennis, track, volleyball and wrestling. The Burncoat football team won the Central Mass Super Bowl championship in 2004 against St. Josephs's.

Partnership with Quinsigamond Community College 
Quinsigamond Community College has partnered with Burncoat High School for its automotive program. QCC has access to classroom, automotive shop, parking and storage space at Burncoat at the end of the high school day. In exchange, the college will pay the high school $15,687 annually, provide two to three seats each year for Burncoat graduates to enroll in the program and allow up to two high school students to participate as a dual enrollment program (in which high school students take college courses and earn credit in both schools). Quinsigamond will also provide upgraded equipment and tools that the high school can use during the day. The program does not disrupt Burncoat's existing automotive program.
The partnership with Burncoat is the first step in creating a Center for Advanced Transportation Technology in Worcester.

Instructional focus
At Burncoat High School, all students will experience a rigor based curriculum taught through instructional strategies meant to improve reading comprehension as measured by MAP, MCAS, PSAT, SAT, MEPA and AP scores as well as other formative assessments.

Notable alumni
 Ron Brace, defensive lineman for the New England Patriots of the National Football League
 Michael Bradley, NBA basketball player
 John J. Mahoney 1982, American politician who represents the 13th Worcester District in the Massachusetts House of Representatives
 Eddie Mekka, actor
 Geoffrey Zakarian, 1977, restaurateur, television personality and author

References

External links 
Burncoat High School website

High schools in Worcester, Massachusetts
Public high schools in Massachusetts
1960s establishments in Massachusetts